The 1925 Creighton Bluejays football team was an American football team that represented Creighton University as a member of the North Central Conference during the 1925 college football season. In its third season under head coach Chet A. Wynne, the team compiled a 6–3–1 record and outscored opponents by a total of 103 to 46. The team played its home games at Creighton Stadium in Omaha, Nebraska.

Three Creighton players were selected as first-team players on the 1925 All-North Central Conference football team: Hickey at quarterback; Keane at halfback; and Lang at end.

Schedule

References

Creighton
Creighton Bluejays football seasons
North Central Conference football champion seasons
Creighton Bluejays football